Muhammad al-Mukhtar al-Shinqiti (Arabic: محمد المختار الشنقيطي; born 1966) is a Mauritanian political activist, author, and academic. He currently works at Hamad Bin Khalifa University as an associate professor of political ethics and history of religion. Besides, he writes Arabic articles in Al Jazeera, which, as of February 2020, had exceeded 400 articles. al-Shinqiti has acquired degrees in different fields of both Religious Sciences and social sciences. These include Fiqh, Translatology, Business administration, and History of religion. He is a strong critic of Arab regimes and writes extensively about the Arab Spring, Islamic civilization, and Islamic reform.

Biography
Bearing one of the most common trinomial given names in Mauritania, al-Shinqiti was born in Nouakchott to a businessman and scholar. He memorized the Qur'an at the age of 11 and expanded his scholarship of religion by taking extra schooling years during high school. He then took an undergraduate double major in both religious sciences and translation studies.

Along with translation in journalism, he first worked as a secondary school teacher. Then, due to his perceived conservative background, he was assigned a tutoring position in a salafi university in Yemen. He resigned two years later, stating that his views conflicted with their mainstream ideology, like, for example, denying the religious retribution of Ridda.

During his scholarship in Texas, he volunteered to serve as an imam in the Islamic Center of South Plains in Lubbock.

Political views
Shinqiti is a strong proponent of Islamism and considers himself "a brother of the Muslim Brotherhood". He emphasizes a compatibility between Shari'a and political freedom, claiming that any purported conflict between the two is a result of an unclear theory of religion. Also, he thinks the Islamic world suffers from a schism between Islamic and secular factions, which necessitates the emphasis on such compatibility.

He has spoken against the Iranian meddling in the Middle East, which he says was facilitated by the United States.

In 2008, responding to Yahya Jammeh's announcement of his intention to execute all homosexuals, al-Shinqiti issued a fatwa about homosexuality in Islam in which he denied a scriptural ground for punishment of homosexuals. However, he assured that it is strongly condemned and is considered by Islam to be immoral and "anti-life".

al-Shinqiti also expressed a wide support for the Turkish involvement in Syria. According to him, it is a sign of an Islamic awakening in which "Arabs and Turks fight against the oppressive regimes".

Personal life
al-Shinqiti is married to Oumoul Sidahmed, a former alumni of South Plains College, and they have three children: a son and two daughters. His youngest daughter, Iman, is an American citizen by birth.

Bibliography

Arabic

Turkish

References

External links
 
 
 
 

1966 births
Living people
People from Nouakchott
Columbia Southern University alumni
Texas Tech University alumni
Mauritanian Islamists
Mauritanian Muslims
20th-century imams
21st-century imams
Academic staff of Hamad Bin Khalifa University